A by-election was held for the New South Wales Legislative Assembly electorate of The Williams on 12 February 1877 because of the resignation of William Watson.

Dates

Candidates
 William Johnston was a general merchant at Clarence Town. This was his first occasion standing for the Legislative Assembly.

 John Nowlan was a cattle breeder from Maitland who had represented The Williams from 1866 until 1874.

Result

William Watson resigned.

See also
Electoral results for the district of Williams
List of New South Wales state by-elections

References

1877 elections in Australia
New South Wales state by-elections
1870s in New South Wales